Triaspis is a scientific name for several genera and may refer to:

Triaspis (plant), a genus of plants in the family Malpighiaceae
Triaspis (wasp), a genus of insects in the family Braconidae